Malá Morava is a municipality and village in Šumperk District in the Olomouc Region of the Czech Republic. It has about 500 inhabitants.

Administrative parts
Villages and hamlets of Křivá Voda, Podlesí, Sklené, Vlaské, Vojtíškov, Vysoká, Vysoký Potok and Zlatý Potok are administrative parts of Malá Morava.

Notable people
Hugo Simon (born 1942), Austrian show jumper, Olympic medalist

References

Villages in Šumperk District